Delbert Bush Ritchhart (November 2, 1910 – February 18, 1981) was an American football player.

Ritchhart was born in 1910 in Carthage, Missouri. He attended La Junta High School in Colorado and then played college football as a guard and end at the University of Colorado from 1933 to 1935. He was selected as an all-Rocky Mountain Conference end. He also played as a third baseman for the Colorado baseball team. 

In March 1936, Ritchhart signed a contract to play professional football in the National Football League (NFL) for the Detroit Lions. He appeared in 21 NFL games, 11 as a starter, during the 1936 and 1937 seasons. He was a two-way player for the Lions, playing linebacker on defense and center on offense.

In August 1938, Ritchart accepted a position as a coach and teacher at a high school in Fruita, Colorado.

References

1910 births
1981 deaths
People from Carthage, Missouri
American football centers
Colorado Buffaloes football players
Detroit Lions players
Players of American football from Missouri